The south-western slider (Lerista microtis)  is a species of skink found in South Australia and Western Australia.

References

Lerista
Reptiles described in 1845
Taxa named by John Edward Gray